Trần Nghệ Tông (December 1321 – 15 December 1394), given name Trần Phủ (陳暊), was the eighth emperor of the Trần dynasty who reigned Vietnam from 1370 to 1372.

Biography

As prince
Nghệ Tông was born in 1321 as Trần Phủ, third son of the Emperor Minh Tông and Concubine Lê who was the younger sister of Empress Hiến Từ. Under the reign of his eldest brother, Emperor Hiến Tông (1329–1341) and his younger brother, Emperor Dụ Tông (1341–1369), Trần Phủ was entitled as Prince Cung Định (Vietnamese: Cung Định Vương). When Dương Nhật Lễ took over the throne in 1369, Prince Cung Định became the Emperor's father-in-law as Nhật Lễ married his daughter.

During his two years of reigning, Emperor Nhật Lễ enraged the imperial court and Trần clan's members by his irresponsible attitude with the throne and his effort of changing his family name back to Dương which meant the ending of the Trần dynasty. As a result, there were several plots trying to overthrow and kill Nhật Lễ, one of them was led by Prince Cung Định himself after the advice of his brother Prince Cung Tuyên Trần Kính, his sister Princess of Thiên Ninh Trần Ngọc Tha and the respected Marquis of Chương Túc Trần Nguyên Đán. Ultimately, Prince Cung Tuyên succeeded in re-establishing the ruling of Trần clan when the mandarin Ngô Lai persuaded Nhật Lễ to surrender and return the throne to Trần clan. Prince Cung Định was enthroned on November 15 of Lunar calendar, 1370 as the Emperor Nghệ Tông and decided to change the era name to Thiệu Khánh (紹慶), Dương Nhật Lễ was downgraded to Duke of Hôn Đức (Hôn Đức Công). Subsequently, Nhật Lễ killed Ngô Lai and was beaten to death with his son by an order from Nghệ Tông.

Nghệ Tông was credited with the re-establishment of Trần clan's ruling in Vietnam from Hôn Đức Công who kept the throne in nearly two years after the decease of Trần Dụ Tông. However, Nghệ Tông was proved to be an inefficient ruler during his reign as emperor and afterward as retired emperor from 1372 to his death at 1394. As the Retired Emperor who oversaw the ruling of his three consecutive successors, Duệ Tông, Phế Đế and Thuận Tông, Nghệ Tông was responsible for the rising in imperial court of Đỗ Tử Bình who brought Emperor Duệ Tông to his death and Hồ Quý Ly who ultimately overthrew the Trần dynasty to found his own dynasty. Nghệ Tông also witnessed many defeats of Đại Việt in the struggle with Champa including Đồ Bàn Battle when Emperor Duệ Tông was killed in action or several attacks by king of Champa Chế Bồng Nga in Thăng Long, capital of Đại Việt. After the decease of Nghệ Tông, the Trần dynasty fell into the situation of completely chaos and survived for only six more years before Hồ Quý Ly took the throne in 1400.

As emperor
Nghệ Tông took the absolute power when he was 49 and already had experience within the imperial court, however according to Đại Việt sử ký toàn thư, the Emperor lacked an important quality of a good ruler which is the decisiveness and thus led the Trần dynasty step by step fall into the hand of his officials.

After the coronation, Nghệ Tông tried to restore the order of imperial court which was heavily damaged during the reign of Dụ Tông and Nhật Lễ but the progress came very slowly, partially because he did not have enough competent mandarins like Chu Văn An who died in 1370 or Trần Nguyên Đán who kept away from the court. Nghệ Tông faced his first failure in March 1371 when king of Champa Chế Bồng Nga commanded troop attacked directly Thăng Long, the capital of Đại Việt, after the petition of Nhật Lễ's mother.  Unable to confront with the strong and well-organized opponent, the imperial court of the Trần dynasty had to flee from Thăng Long and let the capital be violently looted by Chế Bồng Nga's army. Two months after the Champa's assault, Nghệ Tông appointed Hồ Quý Ly for one of the highest position in imperial court, this was the evidence for the Emperor's confidence in Hồ Quý Ly who had two aunts entitled as consorts of Minh Tông and married the Princess of Huy Ninh, Nghệ Tông's younger sister. The Emperor also chose Đỗ Tử Bình, another notorious official in future, for the position of military counsellor in April 1372.

On November 9 of Lunar calendar, 1372, Nghệ Tông decided to cede the throne to his younger brother, Prince Cung Tuyên Trần Kính who now became the Emperor Trần Duệ Tông, and held the title Retired Emperor to co-rule the country with the Emperor as the tradition of the Trần dynasty.

As retired emperor

By nature Duệ Tông was an arrogant and hard-headed ruler who ignored the advice from mandarins about the power of Champa's army, therefore right after the enthronement he began to prepare a military campaign in the southern border against Chế Bồng Nga's troop. Another factor that reinforced the Emperor's decision was the refusal of Chế Bồng Nga to pay tribute for Đại Việt, afterwards historical books reveal that actually king of Champa did send fifteen trays of gold to Đại Việt but Đỗ Tử Bình kept the gold for himself while reported to imperial court that there was not any tribute from Champa. After some skirmishes caused by Champa, Duệ Tông began his decisive campaign in December 1376 in which the Emperor personally commanded with the assistance of Hồ Quý Ly and Đỗ Tử Bình. Eventually, the campaign was ended by a disastrous defeat of Đại Việt's army in Đồ Bàn Battle when the Emperor with many high-ranking mandarins and generals of the Trần dynasty were killed by Champa's force. On the contrary, Hồ Quý Ly and Đỗ Tử Bình survived because Quý Ly, who took charge of logistics, and Tử Bình, who commanded the rearguard, both ran away from the battle instead of trying to rescue the Emperor. Afterwards, Đỗ Tử Bình was only dismissed to the position of plain soldier by the order of Nghệ Tông while Hồ Quý Ly even did not have to face with any charge.

After the death of the Emperor, the Retired Emperor in May 1377 passed the throne to Duệ Tông's eldest prince, Prince Kiến Đức Trần Hiện, now Trần Phế Đế. By the historical records, Phế Đế was actually worse than his father, he had a weak and ignorant character which was profited by Hồ Quý Ly in his gradual control of imperial court. During his reign, the military power was concentrated in the hand of Đỗ Tử Bình who was incapable to deal with many attacks from Champa's army. As a result, Nghệ Tông even decided to hide money in Lạng Sơn in fearing that Chế Bồng Nga's troop might assault and destroy the imperial palace in Thăng Long.

In 1380, Hồ Quý Ly had a minor victory over the troop of Chế Bồng Nga in Thanh Hóa, as a result, Đỗ Tử Bình had to give up his control of Đại Việt army to Hồ Quý Ly. However, in June 1383, Chế Bồng Nga opened a major campaign against Đại Việt, this time Trần Nghệ Tông was so afraid of the enemy that he escaped from Thăng Long ignoring advice from the imperial court. This coward decision of Nghệ Tông was heavily criticized by the historian Ngô Sĩ Liên in his work Đại Việt sử kí toàn thư.

In 1387, Nghệ Tông appointed Hồ Quý Ly as Co-Prime Minister (Đồng bình chương sự), giving him as much power as Nghệ Tông's eldest son, Prime Minister Trần Ngạc (Prince Trang Định). Facing this threat, Emperor Phế Đế allied with Trần Ngạc to overthrow Hồ Quý Ly. However, Quý Ly had already got ahead of this plot by a defamation campaign against the Emperor which ultimately made Nghệ Tông decide to dethrone Phế Đế in December 1388. Phế Đế was downgraded to Prince Linh Đức and forced to commit suicide while his supporters in imperial court were swept by Hồ Quý Ly's side. From now on it was Hồ Quý Ly who held the highest position and power in imperial court.

On December 27 of Lunar calendar, 1387, Nghệ Tông passed the throne to his youngest son Trần Ngung, now Trần Thuận Tông, who was only eleven, the Retired Emperor also entitled Hồ Quý Ly's daughter as the new empress of Thuận Tông. After another defeat of Đại Việt's army under the command of Hồ Quý Ly by Champa, in November 1389 Nghệ Tông appointed Trần Khát Chân for the position of general who conduct all military operations against Chế Bồng Nga's troop. Only a few months after taking charge of the position, Trần Khát Chân had a decisive victory over Champa on January 23, 1390, which resulted in the death of Chế Bồng Nga and thus the stable situation in southern border of Đại Việt. However, the Trần government still deteriorated. In 1391, the Prime Minister Trần Ngạc escaped the imperial city in other to make another attempt against Hồ Quý Ly. Having obtained Nghệ Tông's passive approval, Quý Ly ordered general Nguyễn Nhân Liệt to beat Trần Ngạc to death. Another imperial prince, Trần Nhật Chương, was killed in 1392 on the direct order of Nghệ Tông for taking opposing stance against Quý Ly.

Trần Nghệ Tông died on December 15 of Lunar calendar, 1394 at the age of 73 and left imperial court in the total control of Hồ Quý Ly.  As a result, the Trần dynasty survived for only six years before Hồ Quý Ly overthrew it and established his own reign, the Hồ dynasty.

Family
Trần Nghệ Tông had one wife, Lady Huệ Ý, who died before his coronation and was posthumously entitled as Empress Thục Đức. The Emperor had five sons and one daughter:
 Prince Ngự Câu Trần Húc (?–1381) who was killed by Trần Phế Đế
 Trần Thúc Ngạn
 Prince Trang Định Trần Ngạc (?–1391) who was killed by an order of Hồ Quý Ly, Trần Ngạc's son was Trần Quý Khoáng who was afterward enthroned as Emperor of the Later Trần dynasty
 Prince Giản Định Trần Ngỗi (?–1409) who was afterward the Emperor Giản Định of the Later Trần dynasty
 Prince Chiêu Định Trần Ngung (1378–1398) who became the Emperor Trần Thuận Tông
 Princess Thiên Huy Trần Thục Mỹ

Legacy
Most cities in Vietnam have named major streets after him.

References

 
 
 
 

|- style="text-align: center;"

|-

|-

|-
|-

|-

1321 births
1394 deaths
N
N
Monarchs who abdicated
Vietnamese monarchs